The 1952 Western Michigan Broncos football team represented Michigan College of Education (later renamed Western Michigan University) in the Mid-American Conference (MAC) during the 1952 college football season.  In their 11th and final season under head coach John Gill, the Broncos compiled a 4–4 record (1–4 against MAC opponents), finished in sixth place in the MAC, and were outscored by their opponents, 159 to 154.  The team played its home games at Waldo Stadium in Kalamazoo, Michigan.

Quarterback Chuck Higgins was the team captain.  Halfback Willard Brown received the team's most outstanding player award.

In December 1952, coach Gill became the school's associate athletic director; Jack Petoskey, who had been an assistant coach, became the school's new head football coach.

Schedule

References

Western Michigan
Western Michigan Broncos football seasons
Western Michigan Broncos football